And Along Came Jones is an album by American country music singer George Jones released in 1991 on the MCA Nashville Records label.

Recording
After 19 years with Epic Records, Jones and his wife Nancy, who was now engineering all of his major career moves, signed with Tony Brown of MCA Records, the dynamic chief record executive and staff producer who had been a central figure in the renaissance country music had undergone in the late 1980s and early 1990s.  Brown told The New York Times that signing Jones "was like signing Elvis.  If I could sign only one of all the legends in town, George is the one I would sign.  Everyone still loves him."  Although Jones's last two Epic albums had been ignored by radio, dozens of Nashville's new superstars sang his praises in interviews.  And Along Came Jones was produced by Kyle Lehning, who was hot off a string of hit albums by Randy Travis and had previously produced Jones's last Top Ten hit, a duet with Travis called "A Few Ole Country Boys".  The album took nine months to record – an eternity compared to the singer's early days – and featured the usual mix of ballads, drinking songs, and novelties.  Backed by MCA's powerful promotion team, the album sold better than his previous one had but two singles, "You Couldn't Get The Picture" and "She Loved A Lot In Her Time" (a tribute to Jones' mother Clara), did not crack the top 30 on the charts as Jones lost favor with country radio as the format was altered radically during the early 1990s.  Jones  also made music videos for each single but his resentment towards the country music business and its assembly line star-making machinery was growing, writing in his 1996 autobiography, "I don't care much for many of today's young country singers.  They're not country – they're clones.  Many got their recording contracts because they sound like someone else."

Reception
And Along Came Jones only made it to number 22 on the Billboard country albums chart but was greeted with positive reviews at the time.  James Hunter of The New York Times wrote, "Jones may be singing better than ever right now.  And Along Came Jones may be his most carefully crafted and selected album in a decade."    AllMusic: "His MCA debut wasn't a masterpiece, but it was stronger than almost everything he'd done in the '80s."

Track listing

Personnel
 Eddie Bayers – drums (tracks 5, 8, and 10)
 Dennis Burnside – piano (tracks 2, 7)
 Larry Byrom – acoustic guitar (track 2)
 Mark Casstevens – acoustic guitar (tracks 1 and 4)
 Carol Chase – backing vocals
 Sonny Garrish – steel guitar (track 8)
 Steve Gibson – mandolin, electric guitar, 6-string bass
 Doyle Grisham – steel guitar (tracks 2 and 7) 
 Rob Hajacos – fiddle (track 8)
 John Hughey – steel drums (track 5)
 David Hungate – bass guitar 
 Paul Leim – drums
 Chris Leuzinger – acoustic guitar (track 10)
 Terry McMillan – tambourine, harp, harmonica, cabasa
 Weldon Myrick – steel guitar (tracks 1, 3, 6, and 9)
 Mark O'Connor – fiddle
 Cindy Richardson-Walker – backing vocals
 Hargus "Pig" Robbins – piano
 Billy Joe Walker Jr. – electric guitar, acoustic guitar
 John Willis – electric guitar (track 2)
 Dennis Wilson – backing vocals
 Glenn Worf – bass guitar (track 8)
 Curtis "Mr. Harmony" Young – backing vocals

References

1991 albums
George Jones albums
MCA Records albums
Albums produced by Kyle Lehning